Leviathan is a Biblical sea monster.

Leviathan may also refer to:

Entertainment and media

Books
 Leviathan (Hobbes book), a 1651 book of political philosophy by Thomas Hobbes
 Leviathan (Auster novel), a 1992 novel by Paul Auster
 Leviathan (Westerfeld novel), a 2009 novel by Scott Westerfeld
 Leviathan, a 1975 novel in The Illuminatus! Trilogy by Robert Anton Wilson and Robert Shea
 Leviathan: The Unauthorised Biography of Sydney, a 1999 book by John Birmingham
 Leviathan, a 2007 book by Eric Jay Dolin about whaling
 Leviathan, or The Whale, a 2008 book by Philip Hoare
 Leviathan and Its Enemies, a 1995 manuscript by Samuel T. Francis published posthumously in 2016

Comics
 Leviathan (2000 AD), by Ian Edginton and D'Israeli 
 Leviathan (comic strip), by Peter Blegvad
 Zettai Bōei Leviathan, a 2013 anime

Fictional entities
 Leviathan (DC Comics), a terrorist organization the DC Universe against Batman and his allies
 Leviathan (Digimon)
 Leviathan (Farscape), a race of sentient spaceships in the Farscape television series
 Leviathan (Marvel Comics), a Soviet counterpart to HYDRA

Film and television 
 Leviathan (1989 film), a science fiction/horror film
 Leviathan (2012 film), a North American fishing industry film
 Leviathan (2014 film), a Russian film directed by Andrey Zvyagintsev
 The Leviathan (2015 concept teaser), written by Jim Uhls and directed by Ruairí Robinson
 "Leviathan" (Harsh Realm), an episode of the television series Harsh Realm
 "Leviathan" (Legends of Tomorrow), an episode of the television series Legends of Tomorrow
 Zettai Bōei Leviathan, a 2013 anime
 "The Leviathan" (Elementary), an episode of the television series Elementary

Games
 Leviathan: The Last Day of the Decade, a video game by Lostwood Games
 Mass Effect 3: Leviathan, a DLC pack for the video game Mass Effect 3
 Leviathan, the name of the first raid released in the video game Destiny 2
 Leviathan, a 1987 video game from English Software
 Leviathan class organisms, a type of lifeform in the 2018 video game Subnautica.

Music

Groups
Leviathan (musical project), a solo artist black metal band from San Francisco
 Leviathan, a late 1960s British rock band previously known as the Mike Stuart Span
 The New Leviathan Oriental Fox-Trot Orchestra, dance band from New Orleans

Albums
 Leviathan (Mastodon album), a 2004 album by American progressive/sludge metal band Mastodon
 Leviathan (Therion album), a 2021 album by Swedish symphonic metal band Therion

Songs
 "Leviathan" (Manic Street Preachers song)
 Leviathan (Esprit D'Air song), 2020

Other media
 Leviathan, the former stage name of WWE wrestler Dave Bautista

Science and technology

 8813 Leviathan, a main belt asteroid
 Leviathan (cipher), a stream cipher
  Leviathan, junior synonym of the genus Mammut, or mastodons
 Leviathan gas field in the Eastern Mediterranean
 Leviathan of Parsonstown, a telescope in Birr, Ireland
 Livyatan melvillei (formerly Leviathan melvillei), a species of extinct whale

Transport 
 Leviathan (1849), the first train ferry
 5704 Leviathan, a British LMS Jubilee Class steam locomotive
 HMS Leviathan, several ships
 INS Leviathan, several ships
 SS Great Eastern, a 19th century ocean liner, once called Leviathan
 SS Leviathan, a 20th-century ocean liner

Other uses
 Leviathan (clothing), an Australian  sportswear brand
 Leviathan (cross-stitch), a type of cross-stitch
 Leviathan (Canada's Wonderland), a roller coaster at Canada's Wonderland
 Leviathan (Gold Coast, Australia), a wooden roller coaster at Sea World in Australia
 Leviathan (horse), a racehorse
 Leviathan gas field, a natural gas field in the Mediterranean Sea near Israel
 Leviathan, a line of high-alcohol beers from Harpoon Brewery